The Hinkle–Murphy House is a historic building in Minneapolis, Minnesota, United States.  It was designed in 1886 as a private residence in the Colonial Revival style by William Channing Whitney (later to be the architect of the Minnesota Governor's Residence), and is considered to be the first Georgian Revival style house in Minnesota.  The house was occupied successively by Minneapolis businessmen William H. Hinkle and William J. Murphy.

The Hinkle–Murphy House is located at 619 South 10th Street in the Elliot Park neighborhood near downtown Minneapolis.  It was added to the National Register of Historic Places in 1984 for its architectural significance.  , the interior of the house is used as leasable office space.

See also
 National Register of Historic Places listings in Hennepin County, Minnesota

References

Georgian Revival architecture in Minnesota
Houses completed in 1887
Houses in Minneapolis
Houses on the National Register of Historic Places in Minnesota
National Register of Historic Places in Minneapolis